Mungyeong Sangmu WFC (Korean: 문경 상무) is a South Korean women's football team based in Mungyeong, North Gyeongsang Province. The club is the sports division of the Republic of Korea Armed Forces. The team was founded in 2007 and competes in the WK League, the top division of women's football in South Korea.

Sangmu was previously located in Busan from 2007 to 2015, and in Boeun County between 2016 and 2022. Because of their military status, they are not allowed to sign any foreign players.

Current squad

Season-by-season records

References

External links

Women's football clubs in South Korea
Association football clubs established in 2007
Sport in Busan
WK League clubs
Football Women
Military association football clubs in South Korea
2007 establishments in South Korea